Ajvatovci is a village in the Ilinden Municipality of North Macedonia.

Demographics
As of the 2021 census, Ajvatovci had 247 residents with the following ethnic composition:
Macedonians 235
Persons for whom data are taken from administrative sources 11
Others 1

According to the 2002 census, the village had a total of 232 inhabitants. Ethnic groups in the village include:
Macedonians 231
Serbs 1

References

Villages in Ilinden Municipality